The 1979–80 Cypriot Third Division was the ninth season of the Cypriot third-level football league. Iraklis Gerolakkou won their 2nd title.

Format
Twelve teams participated in the 1979–80 Cypriot Third Division. All teams played against each other twice, once at their home and once away. The team with the most points at the end of the season crowned champions. The first team was promoted to 1980–81 Cypriot Second Division.

Point system
Teams received two points for a win, one point for a draw and zero points for a loss.

League standings

Sources

See also
 Cypriot Third Division
 1979–80 Cypriot First Division
 1979–80 Cypriot Cup

Cypriot Third Division seasons
Cyprus
1979–80 in Cypriot football